The Rawlings Gold Glove Award, usually referred to as the Gold Glove, is the award given annually to the Major League Baseball players judged to have exhibited superior individual fielding performances at each fielding position in both the National League (NL) and the American League (AL), as voted by the managers and coaches in each league. Managers are not permitted to vote for their own players.  Eighteen Gold Gloves are awarded each year (with the exception of 1957, 1985, 2007 and 2018), one at each of the nine positions in each league. In 1957, the baseball glove manufacturer Rawlings created the Gold Glove Award to commemorate the best fielding performance at each position. The award was created from a glove made from gold lamé-tanned leather and affixed to a walnut base. Initially, only one Gold Glove per position was awarded to the top fielder at each position in the entire league; however, separate awards were given for the National and American Leagues beginning in 1958.

Roberto Alomar leads second basemen in wins; he won 10 Gold Gloves in 11 years with three different American League teams. Ryne Sandberg has the second-highest total overall; his nine awards, all won with the Chicago Cubs, are the most by a National League player. Bill Mazeroski and Frank White are tied for the third-highest total, with eight wins. Mazeroski's were won with the Pittsburgh Pirates, and White won his with the Kansas City Royals. Joe Morgan and Bobby Richardson each won five Gold Glove Awards, and four-time winners include Craig Biggio (who won after converting to second base from catcher), Bret Boone, Bobby Grich, Orlando Hudson, Dustin Pedroia, and Brandon Phillips. Hall of Famers who won Gold Gloves at second base include Alomar, Sandberg, Mazeroski, Morgan, Biggio and Nellie Fox.

Only one winning second baseman has had an errorless season; Plácido Polanco set a record among winners by becoming the first to post a season with no errors and, therefore, a 1.000 fielding percentage. The best mark in the National League was set by Phillips (2010) and Darwin Barney (2012). Both committed three errors and amassed a .996 fielding percentage. Grich has made the most putouts in a season, with 484 in 1974. Fox made 453 putouts and the same number of assists in the award's inaugural season; this is more putouts than any National League player has achieved. Mazeroski and Morgan set the National League mark, with 417 in 1967 and 1973 respectively. Sandberg's 571 assists in 1983 are the most among winners in the major leagues; the American League leader is Grich, who made 509 in 1973. Mazeroski turned the most double plays by a winner, collecting 161 in 1966. The American League leader is Fox (141 double plays in 1957).

Key

American League winners

National League winners

See also

Gold Glove middle infield duos
List of Silver Slugger Award winners at second base

Footnotes
In 1957, Gold Gloves were given to the top fielders in Major League Baseball, instead of separate awards for the National and American Leagues; therefore, the winners are the same in each table.
Changed last name to Dee Strange-Gordon in 2020.

References
General

Inline citations

External links
Rawlings Gold Glove Award Website

Gold Glove Award